Gli Giovanni Burón Morales (born 11 June 1994) is a Mexican professional footballer who plays as a right-back.

Club career

América 
Gil Burón made his league debut with América on October 26, 2013, in a 3–1 victory over Puebla. He played in 4 league matches in the  Apertura 2013.

Quéretaro
He was loaned to Querétaro F.C. and played his first league match with the club on February 10, 2013, against Veracruz in a 2–0 win. He made 9 league appearances before going back to America playing in only one match of the Apertura 2014 against  Chiapas F.C.

He was sent back to Querétaro making 7 more league appearances, before returning to América.

Return to América
He returned to Club América in 2015. He played in 13 league matches and several Copa MX games. He made several appearances in the  2014-15 and 2015–16 CONCACAF Champions League. On October 27, 2016, in a  Copa MX semifinal match, Burón played in his first Súper Clásico against Chivas where América were eliminated in penalty kicks.

Murciélagos
Burón was loaned to Murciélagos F.C. of the Ascenso MX for the Clausura 2018 season. He played his first match with the club on January 6, 2018, in a 3–1 home loss against Cimarrones de Sonora.

International career
Burón was part of the U21 squad that represented Mexico at the 2014 Central American and Caribbean Games held in Veracruz. Mexico would go on to win 1st place.

Honours
América
CONCACAF Champions League: 2015–16

León
Liga MX: Guardianes 2020
Leagues Cup: 2021

Mexico U20
Central American and Caribbean Games: 2014

References

External links
 
 

1994 births
Living people
Footballers from Mexico City
Association football fullbacks
Mexican footballers
Club América footballers
Querétaro F.C. footballers
Murciélagos FC footballers
Tuxtla F.C. footballers
Cruz Azul Hidalgo footballers
Club León footballers
Liga MX players
Ascenso MX players
Liga Premier de México players
Tercera División de México players